Debbie Ugochukwu Collins (born 15 April 1992) is a Nigerian model and beauty pageant titleholder who represented Nigeria at Miss World 2016 pageant. She also emerged first runner-up at the 2015 edition of the Most Beautiful Girl in Nigeria pageant thus earning her the opportunity to represent Nigeria at Miss Universe 2015. She is from Ebonyi State.

Pageantry

Most Beautiful Girl in Nigeria 2015
On 24 October 2015, Debbie was voted as the first runner-up of the Most Beautiful Girl in Nigeria 2015 while representing Ebonyi State. She represented Nigeria at the Miss Universe 2015 pageant in US.

Miss World 2016
Debbie represented Nigeria at the Miss World 2016. The Most Beautiful Girl in Nigeria pageant did not hold in 2016 and as first runner up in the previous 2015 event, she was selected to represent Nigeria at the Miss World 2016 pageant.

See also
 List of people from Ebonyi State

References

External links
Profile on Most Beautiful Girl in Nigeria

Miss Universe 2015 contestants
1992 births
Living people
Most Beautiful Girl in Nigeria contestants
Igbo beauty pageant contestants
Miss World 2016 delegates
People from Ebonyi State